Falcon Air Express was a charter airline which was based in Miami, Florida, United States. Falcon Air turned in its certificate to the FAA on June 5, 2015, following the loss of a contract with the US Department of Justice and mounting debt. Falcon Air Express also provided scheduled service from Miami to Curaçao under the banner Dutch Antilles Express, which also ceased service abruptly. Their remaining aircraft are currently at the Lakeland Linder International Airport.

History 

The airline was established in 1995 and started operations in March 1996. It was privately owned and was founded by Emilio Dirube (President and Chief Executive). It was certified as a US domestic airline in 1998, operating the Boeing 727-200 to mostly Caribbean destinations.

In May 2006, Falcon Air Express filed for Chapter 11 bankruptcy protection and laid off 73 of its 169 employees. However in 2009, it was bought by the Ramiz Family and after some years of restructuring, as of December 2011, they were once again employing over 150.

In the two months preceding the June 5, 2015, closure, the workforce was reduced to about 50 employees, all working with the promise they would be paid in the near future. When the company was finally closed, many of  these employees were left owed the equivalent of over two months' salary.

In this airline's history there was a repossession on an aircraft. The tail number is unidentified, but the aircraft's wrecked nose section lays in hangar at the Lakeland Linder International Airport.

Fleet 

The Falcon Air Express fleet included the following aircraft:

See also 
 List of defunct airlines of the United States

References

External links 

 
 Falcon Air Pilots Association (FAPA)
 airfleets.net

Defunct charter airlines of the United States
Airlines established in 1995
Companies based in Miami-Dade County, Florida
Airlines based in Florida
Airlines disestablished in 2015
Defunct airlines of the United States